The following is a comprehensive discography of Kyuss, a Southern California-based stoner/desert rock band, active between 1988 and 1995, and again since their reunion in 2010 (as Kyuss Lives!). During their initial seven-year run, Kyuss had four full-length studio albums, one split album, seven singles, and four music videos. They also released one EP under the name Sons of Kyuss. This list does not include material performed by members or former members of Kyuss that was recorded with Queens of the Stone Age, Slo Burn, Unida, Hermano, Yawning Man, Mondo Generator, Brant Bjork and the Bros, Eagles of Death Metal, Them Crooked Vultures, and Fu Manchu.

Albums

Studio albums

Compilation albums

Extended plays

Tribute album

Singles

Music videos
"Thong Song" (1992)
"Green Machine" (1992)
"Demon Cleaner" (1994)
"One Inch Man" (1995)

References

Heavy metal group discographies
Discographies of American artists